John van Leeuwarden (4 July 1941 – 31 January 2019), who recorded under the name Johnny Lion, was a Dutch singer, journalist and actor.  His best known song as a solo artist was his hit single "Sophietje". He also recorded with The Jumping Jewels and had  a few hit songs including "Wheels"", "Africa" and "Irish Washerwoman".

Musical career
Lion started his musical career in 1959 as singer of Johnny and his Jewels, later named The Jumping Jewels. The Jumping Jewels had a number-one hit single in the Netherlands with the instrumental "Wheels" in 1961,<ref>{{cite web |url=https://nos.nl/artikel/2270006-zanger-johnny-lion-van-sophietje-overleden.html |work=nos.nl |title=Zanger Johnny Lion van 'Sophietje' overleden}}</ref> as well as top 10 hits with "Africa" (No. 8) in 1963 and	"Irish Washerwoman" / "Java" (No. 9) in 1964.  

Lion left the band in 1965 to focus on a solo career. He had two hit singles: "Sophietje" (No. 5) in 1965 and "Tjingeling" (No. 14) in 1966.  Sophietje was a Dutch translation of Swedish song "Fröken Fräken" and dedicated to Lion's then-girlfriend Sophie van Kleef. He had two further minor hits in the 1980s, first the title song of the 1983 film Brandende liefde, and "Alleen in Dallas" in 1988.

He also collaborated with Rob de Nijs in Circus Boltini. Boltini was Lion's second wife Mariska Akkerman's uncle.

Journalism
In the 1990s he wrote columns for weekly-magazine Panorama.

Acting
Lion acted in the 1998 film Siberia and in 2003 he had a minor role in Van God Los''.

Personal life
He was married twice. Lion suffered from Alzheimer's disease and lung cancer in his final years, and died in January 2019.

References

External links

 Bio – Muziekencyclopedie 

1941 births
2019 deaths
Musicians from The Hague
20th-century Dutch male singers
Dutch male actors
Dutch journalists
Deaths from lung cancer
Deaths from cancer in the Netherlands